Serhiy Petrovich Kucherenko (born 22 August 1961) is a Ukrainian football coach and former player.

Managerial career
In 2005, Kucherenko was appointed head coach of Podillya Khmelnytskyi. In 2007, he became head coach of Spartak Ivano-Frankivsk. From 2007 to 2008, Kucherenko  was coach of Desna Chernihiv. In 2009, he was head coach of Uzbek Mash'al club.

Personal life
Kucherenko's son Serhiy was also a Desna Chernihiv football player.

References

External links 
 

1961 births
Living people
Soviet footballers
Ukrainian footballers
Footballers from Odesa
Association football defenders
FC Podillya Khmelnytskyi players
FC Zirka Kropyvnytskyi players
FC Spartak Ryazan players
FC Dynamo Odesa players
Ukrainian football managers
Ukrainian Premier League managers
FC Desna Chernihiv managers
FC Podillya Khmelnytskyi managers
FC Spartak Ivano-Frankivsk managers